Aryan FC (also known as both Aryans and Aryan; formerly Techno Aryan FC) is an Indian professional multi-sports club based in Kolkata, West Bengal. The club competes in the Calcutta Football League.

Founded in 1884 as Aryan Sports Club. it started playing football some years later, making it one of Asia's oldest football clubs. It plays home matches at the East Bengal-Aryan Ground.

History

Formation and journey (1884–1930)

During the age of associations of Bengali nationalism in late 19th century, Sir Dukhiram Majumder, Kalicharan Mitra, Manmatha Ganguly were the pupils of Nagendra Prasad Sarbadhikari, who practiced and popularized football. Majumder founded a sporting organization named "Students Union" in Mohun Bagan Villa. When the organization discontinued due to disagreements over wearing boots, Majumder went on to form Aryans Club in Maharaja Durga Charan Laha's Telipara field in Shyampukur. Before the advent of East Bengal and Mohammedan Sporting club, it was Aryan (then known as Aryans Club) and Mohun Bagan AC, who enjoyed an elite status among Indian football clubs. Founded in 1884 as a multi-sports club, association football was introduced in Aryan few years later and thus it became one of the oldest football clubs in India.

Majumder (1875 – 16 June 1929) became father figure of Aryans during the pre-independence era, regarded as first coach of India who brought up and guided players like Syed Abdus Samad, Gostha Pal, Shibdas Bhaduri and others. Forming a coaching institute within the club, he managed the team throughout his life. It was Majumder, who started Aryan's famous policy of bringing up unknown yet talented footballers. In 1914, the Indian Football Association (IFA) permitted only two native clubs in the CFL Second Division; It Aryan one of them. In that season, Mohun Bagan earned promotion to the Premier Division but Aryan was promoted to the top division two years later. Under Majumdar's coaching, Aryan achieved fourth place in 1920–21 Calcutta Football League and reached the semi-finals of Rovers Cup in 1928. Legendary footballers Balaidas Chatterjee and Karuna Bhattacharya appeared with Aryan at that time.

1930–1960
While Aryan didn't enjoy the same degree of success as Mohun Bagan, they did perform well in patches. The club participated consecutively in the Calcutta Football League with their rivals, and Mohammed Salim (first Indian footballer who played for an overseas club) was one of the legendary players who appeared with Aryan in 1933–34. In the mid-1930s, Dukhiram's nephew Santosh Kumar "Chone" Majumder became head coach of the club. One of Aryan's greatest moments came in 1940, that year, they won IFA Shield defeating Mohun Bagan 4–1, one of India's premier tournaments. They became only the 3rd Indian run club to win the prestigious title. Moreover, they crushed Mohun Bagan 4–1 in the final. In the 40s, Alil Dey and Modassar Yasin Ali Khan from Tangail, became two of the earliest known Bangladeshi footballers to play for the club.

Aryan enjoyed another spell of success in mid-1950s, reaching the final of IFA Shield in 1955 and 1956 with an ageing Sahu Mewalal in their ranks, who scored multiple hat-tricks for the team. He also emerged as top scorer of CFL in 1949, 1951, 1953, 1954, and 1958. Before or after gaining independence from the British raj, Aryan participated in every Calcutta Football League editions (until the formation of Premier Division B), which is Asia's oldest football league. During that time, legendary players from Bengal including Sanat Seth have appeared with the club colours.

1960–1980
As the years progressed they gradually lost their status as a top club, instead Aryan became the breeding ground of some of the most famous players in Kolkata maidan. Players like Pradip Kumar Banerjee, Prasun Banerjee, Sanat Seth, Pradyut Barman, Goutam Sarkar and Sudhir Karmakar started out in Aryan, before moving on to the bigger clubs. Balai Dey, the only footballer who represented the two nations India and Pakistan in international football, appeared with Aryan in 1967. Other than another IFA Shield win in 1983 (title shared with East Bengal), Aryan didn't achieve a lot of success in modern era.

On the morning of 5 August 1971, the Naxalite intellectual and poet Saroj Dutta was killed by the police in the grounds of the Aryan club on the Calcutta maidan.

In 1975, Aryan emerged champion of Churachand Singh Invitation Trophy defeating Rajasthan Club.

1990–present
In 1998, Aryan reached the final of All Airlines Gold Cup but lost 4–3 to East Bengal in penalty-shootout. They again finished on second position in 2010.

Home ground

Aryan FC plays most of their home matches of Calcutta Premier Division at the East Bengal Ground, which is located in Kolkata Maidan area and has a capacity of 23,500 spectators.

The stadium is officially known as East Bengal–Aryan Ground, having Aryan AC gallery in its northeastern part.

Sponsorship

The club is currently being sponsored by the Techno India Group, which 
is a group of engineering and management colleges, public schools. JIS University is the shirt sponsor. The club also acquired service of Trak-Only as their main shirt sponsor.

Current squad

Notable players
For current and former notable Aryan FC players with a Wikipedia article, see: Aryan FC players.

Honours

League
CFL Second Division
Champions (2): 1991, 1996–97

Cup
 IFA Shield
Champions (1): 1940, 1983 (joint winners)
Runners-up (2): 1955, 1956
 Trades Cup
Champions (1): 1913
 Bordoloi Trophy
Champions (2): 1965, 1966
 All Airlines Gold Cup
Runners-up (2): 1998, 2010
 Churachand Singh Trophy
Champions (1): 1975
 Lal Bahadur Shastri Cup
Champions (1): 1978 
 Rovers Cup
Runners-up (1): 1950
Independence Day Cup (WB)
Runners-up (1): 1999
Manik Upadhayay Memorial Trophy
Runners-up (1): 2022

Other department

Men's cricket
The men's cricket section of Aryan is affiliated with the Cricket Association of Bengal (CAB), and participate in First Division League, J.C. Mukherjee T-20 Trophy and other regional tournaments.

Men's hockey
Aryan formerly had a men's field hockey section, which was affiliated to the Bengal Hockey Association (BHA), and participated in multiple nationwide tournaments including Beighton Cup. The team was once one of the powerful teams from Bengal, with having players from Engineering institution of the Jadavpur University.

See also

 Football in Kolkata
 List of football clubs in Kolkata
 List of football clubs in India

Notes

Bibliography

Dutta, P. L., Memoir of 'Father of Indian Football' Nagendraprasad Sarbadhikary (Calcutta: N. P. Sarbadhikary Memorial Committee, 1944) (hereafter Memoir)

Ghosh, Saurindra Kumar. Krira Samrat Nagendraprasad Sarbadhikary 1869–1940 (Calcutta: N. P. Sarbadhikary Memorial Committee, 1963) (hereafter Krira Samrat).
Roselli, John. Self Image of Effeteness: Physical Education and Nationalism in Nineteenth Century Bengal. Past & Present (journal). 86 (February 1980). p. 121–48.
Sinha, Mrinalini. Colonial Masculinity, The Manly Englishman and the Effeminate Bengali in the Late Nineteenth Century (Manchester: Manchester University Press, 1995).
Chatterjee, Partha. The Nation and Its Fragments: Colonial and Post-colonial Histories (Calcutta: Oxford University Press, 1995).
Mason, Football on the Maidan, p. 144; Dimeo, Football and Politics in Bengal, p. 62.

From recreation to competition: Early history of Indian football . pp. 124–141. Published online: 6 Aug 2006. www.tandfonline.com. Retrieved 30 June 2021.

References

External links
 Official website (technoaryanclub.com)
 Aryan Football Club archive at Kolkata Football
Aryan FC at ifawb.org – IFA (archived)
 Aryan Club – Rising From the Ashes at The Hard Tackle (archived)

Aryan FC at Soccerway
Aryan FC at Flashscore
Aryan FC at Soccerstand
Aryan FC at WorldFootball.net

Aryan FC
1884 establishments in India
Association football clubs established in 1884
I-League clubs
I-League 2nd Division clubs
Football clubs in Kolkata
Sports clubs in India
Multi-sport clubs in India